Lee Chun-jae (RR: I Chun-jae; born January 31, 1963) is a South Korean serial killer known for committing the Hwaseong serial murders. Between 1986 and 1994, Lee murdered 15 women and young girls in addition to numerous sexual assaults predominantly in Hwaseong, Gyeonggi and surrounding areas. The serial murders, which remained unsolved for 30 years, are considered to be the most infamous in South Korea's modern history. They are often compared to those committed by the Zodiac Killer in the United States, and served as the inspiration for the 2003 film Memories of Murder.

Lee was sentenced to life imprisonment with the possibility of parole after 20 years for killing his sister-in-law in 1994, but despite DNA evidence and his confession to the other murders in 2019, he could not be prosecuted for them because the statute of limitations had expired.

Early life
Born on 31 January 1963, Lee Chun-jae was said to be an individual who grew up well in his early years, and had a good education up till high school and worked well with others, according to his mother in 2019 when the 75-year-old was interviewed about her son's crimes. Lee's mother was reportedly devastated and shocked to hear that her son was involved in the unsolved Hwaseong murders. He had a younger brother who drowned in his childhood, an incident which purportedly traumatised him.

After graduating from high school in February 1983, Lee joined the Republic of Korea Army and served as a tank driver; he was discharged on January 23, 1986. He then worked for an electric parts company. In 1990, he began his job at a parent construction company in Cheongpa, Yongsan, where he became a crane driver without a license. The following year, he was a crane driver for an aggregate company in Cheongwon, Chungcheongbuk. In April 1992, Lee married a bookkeeper and quit his job in March 1993. According to Lee's wife, Lee was an alcoholic and violent husband and father who often physically abused her and their son.

On September 26, 1989, around 00:55, Lee broke into a house in Gwangju, Suwon, Gyeonggi Province, with weapons and gloves, and was discovered by the landlord. He was sentenced by the Suwon District Court to one year and six months in prison in the first trial in February 1990 for the charges of robbery and violence. After the first trial, Lee filed an appeal, claiming that he was beaten by an unknown young man and entered the victim's house while being chased. In the second trial, following Lee's appeal, the court suspended his sentence to two years of probation, where he was released in mid-April, 1990.

Hwaseong serial murders 
For a period of four years and seven months, between September 15, 1986, and April 3, 1991, Lee Chun-jae, then in his twenties, committed the Hwaseong serial murders, which were a series of rapes and murders that occurred in the rural city of Hwaseong in Gyeonggi Province. The victims, all women, were found bound, gagged, raped, and in most cases strangled to death with their own clothes, such as pantyhose or socks. The murders sparked the largest criminal case in South Korea with over 2million man-days spent on investigation and over 21,000 suspects investigated. The cases remained unsolved for 30 years, until Lee himself was identified as a suspect in 2019 and Lee confessed to 4 undisclosed murders not attributed to the serial murders and all 10 serial murders, including the case previously determined to be a copycat crime for which a man named Yoon Seung-yeo was sentenced to life in prison.

Background 
The case began with the disappearance of Lee Wan-im (71) on September 15, 1986, while returning home after visiting her daughter. Her body was found in a pasture on September 19, 1986, at 14:00, four days following the murder. A month later on October 20, 1986, Park Hyun-sook (25) disappeared after getting off the bus while returning home from Songtan. Her body was found on October 23, 1986, at 14:50 in a canal. Two months later on December 12, 1986, Gwon Jung-bon (25) disappeared in front of her house. Her body was found three months later on April 23, 1987, at 14:00 in an embankment. Seven more murders followed over the next years.

The last murder was estimated to have taken place around 21:00 on April 3, 1991. Gwon Soon-sang (69) was discovered dead, raped, and strangled with pantyhose on a hill.

Investigation 
The case is infamous within Korea for being the first truly identifiable string of murders with a similar modus operandi. Reportedly, more than 2million police officers, a record number for a single case, were mobilized to investigate the murders. Moreover, police officers involved spent 2million man-days on the case. The total number of suspects also grew to enormous numbers, eventually reaching a total count of 21,280 individuals. In addition, 40,116 individuals had their fingerprints taken, and 570 DNA samples and 180 hair samples were analyzed.

The first five murders happened within a 6 km (3.7 mile) radius of Hwaseong, prompting police to spread out in teams of two, positioned every 100 meters (328 feet), but the next killing happened where there was no police presence. During the investigation, rumors that the killer targeted women wearing red clothes on rainy days spread, leading some female police officers to wear red clothes in an attempt to lure the killer into a trap.

A suspect sketch was drawn based on the memory of the bus driver, Kang, and bus conductor, Uhm, who saw a man get on the bus shortly after the seventh murder on September 7, 1988. The characteristics of the suspect, which were described by the bus driver, were similar to the descriptions given by survivors who were sexually assaulted. According to the victims, the culprit at the time of the incident was a thin-framed man in his mid-20s, with a height of 165 to 170 centimeters, short cut sporty-type hair, no double eyelids, and a sharp nose. In addition, he was described as having soft hands. Police also stated that the suspect had a "B" blood type, but in 2019, police acknowledged that this was likely inaccurate, because Lee has blood type "O". A survivor of the serial murders, 36-year-old Lee Geum-ran, was attacked by Lee sometime in late 1986 and she described him as skinny, with a low voice.

On July 27, 1989, Yoon Sung-yeo, a 22-year-old man, was arrested for the murder of the eighth victim, 14-year-old Park Sang-hee. Yoon admitted guilt during questioning, and according to a 1989 report written by an expert at National Forensic Service, the forensic tests of pubic hair samples found at the scene suggested similarities with his, returning a 40% match with Yoon's. This case was determined to be a copycat crime, and Yoon was sentenced to life in prison.

In addition, in the tenth case, the genes obtained from a semen sample were different from the ninth case, and the location and method of crime were different from the other cases, suggesting a different culprit. Except for the first crime, which occurred around 06:00, the second to tenth murders occurred mainly between 19:00 and 23:00.

Reports state that at least four individuals, deemed as possible suspects, took their own lives in the 1990s after being investigated and allegedly abused by police.

Public reaction 
The release of the film Memories of Murder in 2003, which was partially inspired by the serial murders, sparked renewed interest in the case. The murder of a female college student in Hwaseong in 2004 also sparked renewed interest and fears that a serial killer had returned. The serial murders made headlines again as the statute of limitations for the most recent victims was due to expire on April 2, 2006. At the time of the killings, there was a 15-year statute of limitations for first-degree murder. This was increased to 25 years in 2007, and finally lifted in 2015, but it was not retroactive. However, evidence and police records were kept due to the significance of the case.

Identification and confession
On September 18, 2019, police announced that Lee had been identified as a suspect in the serial murders. He was identified after DNA from the underwear of one of the victims was matched with his, and subsequent DNA testing linked him to four of the other unsolved serial murders. At the time he was identified, he was already serving a life sentence at a prison in Busan for the rape and murder of his sister-in-law. Lee initially denied any involvement in the serial murders, but on October 2, 2019, police announced that Lee had confessed to killing 14 people, including all 10 victims in the serial murders, which includes a case previously considered to be a copycat crime, and 4 others. Three of those other murders happened in Hwaseong but had not previously been attributed to the serial killer, and the other two happened in Cheongju. As of October 2019, details about those four victims have not been released. In addition to the murders, he also confessed to more than 30 rapes and attempted rapes.

On November 15, 2019, police announced that they had reached a provisional conclusion that Lee was responsible for all 10 serial murders. Police expressed that Lee had a weak self-esteem due to his introverted personality but experienced a sense of accomplishment and self-reliance for the first time in his mandatory military service, which led him to commit sex crimes to express his frustration caused by his monotonous life following his discharge from the military. The provincial police chief stated that Lee displayed psychopathic tendencies by being unable to empathize with the victims' pain and suffering and continuously showing off his crimes.

On July 2, 2020, the police confirmed that Lee committed 14 murders and nine rapes in relation to the Hwaseong serial murders with the motive of relieving his sexual desire, closing the case 33 years after the first victim's death. On November 2, 2020, Lee appeared in court as a witness for the 8th murder re-trial, where he publicly confessed to committing 14 murders in relation to the Hwaseong serial murders and 30 sex crimes, which led to Yoon being acquitted. Lee remained in prison serving his life sentence. Lee also expressed that he had no intention to be granted parole and released, as he did not want to face the public condemnation for his crime like notorious child rapist Cho Doo-soon, whose release after serving his 12-year jail term led to public outrage and widespread protests.

Wrongful conviction of Yoon Sung-yeo 
Yoon was sentenced to life in prison, but appealed the ruling at the time, alleging that police coerced him into giving false confessions through torture. His appeal was denied and he served 19.5 years in jail before being released on parole in 2009.

Yoon filed for a re-trial of his case on November 13, 2019, following news reports that Lee had confessed to all 10 serial murders. Two days later, police announced that they had reached a provisional conclusion that Lee was responsible for the murder for which Yoon was convicted. Police said Lee's confession in the eighth murder 'elaborately and coherently' described both the scene and the victim. This raised concerns that police had charged an innocent man, with the district prosecutors' office confirming that Yoon underwent cruel treatment by investigators at the time of his arrest and that a forensic report by the National Forensic Service had been fraudulently written. In December 2019, the Gyeonggi South Provincial Police Agency booked and charged eight of the original investigators with abuse of power and illegal detention for allegedly physically abusing Yoon when he was a suspect, forcing him to make a false confession, and falsifying investigative documents.

The court accepted Yoon's plea for a re-trial in January 2020. The final court hearing was held on November 2, 2020, where Lee stood as a witness confessing to the murder and describing the crime scene. Yoon Sung-yeo was acquitted of murder on 17 December 2020, after the re-trial court accepted that Yoon was innocent all along and finding Lee guilty of Bak's murder despite the expiration of the statute of limitations.

In media 
Several films and television shows were based on the Hwaseong serial murders.
 Memories of Murder (2003)
 Confession of Murder (2012)
 Gap-dong (2014)
 Signal (2016)
 Tunnel (2017)
 Criminal Minds (2017)
 Partners for Justice (2018)
 Signal (2018)
 Unknown Number (2019)
 Flower of Evil (2020)
 Taxi Driver (2021)

Sister-in-law's murder and arrest
After Lee's wife left him in December 1993, he invited over his 18-year-old sister-in-law, then proceeded to drug, rape, and kill her on January 13, 1994. According to the detective who investigated him, Lee went to his father-in-law offering help in the search for his missing sister-in-law, and both reported that she might have been abducted. Lee was arrested a few days later, on January 18, after repeated questioning where he later asked, "How many years do you serve in prison for rape and murder?" Lee denied any responsibility and the court overturned his confession, stating that he made a false statement because of police coercion. However, Lee was convicted and sentenced to death in May 1994, and his conviction was upheld in September of the same year. The Supreme Court of Korea reviewed the case in 1995 and Lee's death sentence was reduced to life imprisonment, with the possibility of parole after 20 years.

List of known victims
The first 10 murders were part of the Hwaseong serial murders.

See also
 List of serial killers by country
 List of serial killers by number of victims

References

1963 births
1986 in South Korea
1987 in South Korea
1988 in South Korea
1990 in South Korea  
1991 in South Korea
1994 in South Korea
1986 murders in South Korea
1987 murders in South Korea
1988 murders in South Korea
1990 murders in South Korea
1991 murders in South Korea
1994 murders in South Korea
Hwaseong, Gyeonggi
Living people
Male serial killers
Korean prisoners sentenced to life imprisonment
People from Hwaseong, Gyeonggi
Prisoners sentenced to life imprisonment by South Korea
South Korean murderers of children
South Korean prisoners sentenced to life imprisonment
South Korean rapists
South Korean serial killers
1989 crimes in South Korea
Violence against women in South Korea